James Michael Phelan (December 5, 1892 – November 14, 1974) was an American football player and coach of football and basketball.  He served as the head football coach at the University of Missouri (1920–1921), Purdue University (1922–1929), the University of Washington (1930–1941), and Saint Mary's College of California (1942–1947), compiling a career college football record of 137–87–14.

Phelan also coached the Los Angeles Dons of the All-America Football Conference (AAFC) from 1948 to 1949 , the N.Y Yanks and Dallas Texans of the National Football League (NFL) in 1951 and 1952, tallying a professional football coaching record of 13-35-2.  In addition, he was the head basketball coach at Saint Mary's for two seasons during World War II (1943–1945), where he amassed a record 10–11.  Phelan played college football as a quarterback at the University of Notre Dame from 1915 to 1917.  He was inducted into the College Football Hall of Fame as a coach in 1973.

Playing career
After growing up in Portland, Oregon, Phelan went to Notre Dame in 1915.  In his first game as a reserve quarterback and placekicker for the football team, he threw for a touchdown and ran for another in a 32–0 victory over Alma College.  This earned him the starting job, and he would go on to complete a 7–1 season, the lone defeat was by one point at Nebraska.

The 1916 team was a defensive juggernaut, shutting out every team it played except for its meeting with Army, which it lost 30–10, thus finishing the season 8–1.  The 1917 campaign began with a 55–0 victory over Kalamazoo, followed by a scoreless tie at Wisconsin, in which Phelan attempted to win the game by kicking a 61-yard field goal; the ball bounced off the crossbar.  A 7–0 loss at Nebraska the following week was the last game of his career, as he was drafted into military service for World War I and sent to Camp Taylor in Louisville, Kentucky.

Coaching career
Following the war, Phelan entered the college coaching ranks. From 1920 to 1921, he coached at Missouri, and compiled a 13–3 record. From 1922 to 1929, he coached at Purdue, and compiled a 35–22–4 record there. From 1930 to 1941, he coached at Washington in Seattle, and compiled a 65–37–9 record there.

Following a six-year stint as head coach of Saint Mary's (CA) that included two bowl appearances, Phelan joined the coaching staff of three professional football franchises, including a two-year stint as the head coach of the Los Angeles Dons and one season as head coach of the NFL's Dallas Texans in 1952.

Phelan was inducted into the College Football Hall of Fame in 1973.

Head coaching record

College football

References

External links
 
 James Phelan at Pro-Football-Reference.com

1892 births
1974 deaths
American football quarterbacks
American men's basketball coaches
American military personnel of World War I
Basketball coaches from California
Basketball coaches from Oregon
Coaches of American football from California
Coaches of American football from Oregon
College Football Hall of Fame inductees
Dallas Texans (NFL) coaches
Los Angeles Dons coaches
Missouri Tigers football coaches
New York Yanks coaches
Notre Dame Fighting Irish football players
Players of American football from Portland, Oregon
Players of American football from Sacramento, California
Purdue Boilermakers football coaches
Saint Mary's Gaels athletic directors
Saint Mary's Gaels football coaches
Saint Mary's Gaels men's basketball coaches
Washington Huskies football coaches